The 2003 Zürich cantonal elections were held on 6 April 2003, to elect the seven members of the cantonal Executive Council) and the 180 members of the Cantonal Council.

Background 
In 1999, the bourgeois parties alliance of FDP, CVP, and SVP won five of the seven executive councillors, with the left parties (SP and Greens) won the remaining two. In this election, the SP hoped to gain a second seat; the SVP, bolstered by their national momentum, left the alliance with the FDP and CVP to run alone.

Electoral system

Executive Council 
The Executive Council contains 7 members elected using a two-round majoritarian system. In the first round, electors have up to seven votes and the 7 most-voted candidates reaching an overall majority (>50%) are elected. If seats remain to be filled, a runoff is held where electors have as many votes as seats remaining, and the candidates with the most votes (simple plurality) are elected.

Cantonal Council 
The Cantonal Council was elected using open-list proportional representation in 18 multi-member constituencies with no threshold. In each constituency, voters have as many votes as there are seats to fill (panachage is permitted); these votes each count both for the candidate and for the list they stand in.

Seats are first apportioned to the apparentments (groups of lists) then to the lists directly (minimizing vote splitting in the smaller constituencies); in each list the seats are attributed to the candidates reaching the most votes.

Results

Executive Council 

In the Executive Council, the SP fielded both incumbent councillor Markus Notter and former cantonal councillor and current national councillor Regine Aeppli, hoping to gain a seat from any other party except incumbent green federal councillor Verena Diener running for re-election. They would gain the seat from the CVP, where Winterthur executive city councillor Hans Hollenstein failed to hold Ernst Buschor's seat; FDP councillor Rüdi Jecker narrowly saved his seat over Hollenstein and the third SVP candidate Hans Rutschmann by only three thousand votes. Women represented a majority of the council for the first time.

Cantonal Council 

The SVP remained the largest party by gaining a seat but their ally Aktive Senioren, who caucused with them, lost both their seats. The largest gains were done by the SP, gaining ten seats, well over their expectations. The FDP lost seven seats, while the Greens overtook the CVP as the fourth largest party. The Ring of Independents, which had been historically strong in the canton, lost their representation for the first time since 1939 as they had disbanded two years earlier.

Panachage and apparentements played a role, mainly for smaller parties: the Greens received a large number of panachage votes from the SP, while the Statistical Office calculated most of the EVP's seats and the EDU and SD's sole seats were owed to apparentements.

References

2003 elections in Switzerland
Cantonal elections in Zürich